Kaltak is a village in Batken Region of Kyrgyzstan. It is part of the Kadamjay District. Its population was 1,869 in 2021. It is situated between Üch-Korgon and Kyzyl-Kyya.

References

External links 
Places in Kyrgyzstan

Populated places in Batken Region